Michela Belmonte (1925–1978) was an Italian film actress. She was the younger sister of the actress Maria Denis, and briefly enjoyed a career as a leading lady during the Fascist era appearing in major films such as Roberto Rossellini's A Pilot Returns. Following the overthrow of Benito Mussolini's regime in 1943, she retired from acting.

Filmography
 A Pilot Returns (1942)
 The Three Pilots (1942)
 Il nostro prossimo (1943)

References

Bibliography 
 Bondanella, Peter. The Films of Roberto Rossellini. Cambridge University Press, 1993.

External links 
 

1925 births
1978 deaths
Italian film actresses
Actors from Padua
20th-century Italian actresses